The National Wrestling Alliance (NWA) Hall of Fame is an American professional wrestling hall of fame maintained by the NWA. It was established in 2005 to honor select wrestling personalities, mostly alumni of the NWA. Inductees receive commemorative medals that have their names inscribed on it with the logo of the NWA.

The Class of 2005, the inaugural inductees into the Hall of Fame did not have a formal induction ceremony; as a result, they received their medals at a later time. A private gathering was conducted for the Class of 2006, in which inductees received their medal. Beginning with the Class of 2008 on June 7, 2008, a ceremony has been conducted to formally induct the inductees. There were no inductees in 2007 due to the planning of an international expansion to the NWA. On June 7, 2008, the Class of 2008 was inducted into the Hall of Fame. Ric Flair, a member of the Class of 2008 and a World Wrestling Entertainment (WWE) employee at the time of the ceremony, was inducted on October 4, 2008 after his WWE contract had expired; his WWE contract prevented him from appearing in other organizations. Similarly to the World Championship Wrestling's Hall of Fame, the 2008 ceremony was held during a wrestling event.

Inductees for the Class of 2009 were announced during the summer of 2009 for an induction ceremony on September 26; however, that ceremony never took place and the announced wrestling personalities were never inducted formally, evident by the NWA's official website for the NWA Hall of Fame.

The inaugural Class of 2005 was inducted throughout 2005. Wrestler Lou Thesz's posthumous induction led the class, which included wrestler Harley Race, commentator Gordon Solie, and promoters Jim Cornette, Jim Barnett, and Sam Muchnick. Commentator Lance Russell's induction led the Class of 2006 on October 13, 2006, which also consisted of wrestlers Dory Funk Jr., Eddie Graham, Robert Gibson and Ricky Morton (The Rock 'n' Roll Express), Leilani Kai, and Saul Weingeroff. On June 7, 2008, wrestler Tommy Rich's induction led the Class of 2008, which consisted of wrestlers Joe and Jean Corsica (Corsica Brothers), Dennis Condrey and Bobby Eaton (The Midnight Express), Nikita Koloff, The Iron Sheik, and Ric Flair. Overall there are 87 inductees, 45 inductees were inducted posthumously.

Inductees

Group inductions

Footnotes
 – Entries without a birth name indicates that the inductee did not perform under a ring name.
 – Before the 1990s, the National Wrestling Alliance (NWA) distributed many of its titles among its numerous members. Other promotions listed in this column were, or are currently, members of the NWA.
 – This section mainly lists the major accomplishments of each inductee in the NWA.

See also
List of professional wrestling halls of fame

References
General
 
Specific

External links
NWA Hall Of Fame official website

2005 establishments in the United States
Awards established in 2005
National Wrestling Alliance
Professional wrestling halls of fame
Professional wrestling-related lists
Halls of fame in Texas